Four bore or 4 bore is an obsolete black powder caliber of the 19th century, used for the hunting of large and potentially dangerous game animals. The specifications place this caliber between the larger two bore and the lesser six bore. This caliber was the quintessential elephant gun caliber of the black powder safari rifles. The caliber was also used for the Coffman cartridges used for starting large aero engines such as the Rolls-Royce Griffon as used in the later Marks of Supermarine Spitfire.

Specifications

The name, derived from an old English practice of bore measurements in gun-making which refers to a nominally 4-gauge bore, that is, a bore diameter that would accommodate a pure lead round ball weighing  of a pound. Commonly, 4 bores were closer to 0.935–0.955 inch calibre, which is closer to 5 gauge.

History 1750–1880

As European settlers found early on, their regular muskets were inadequate against dangerous African game. Early gun adaptations were essentially shotguns with extra long (smoothbore) barrels, firing solid balls.
By the mid-19th century, 12, 10, 8 and 4 bore muskets had been strengthened and bulked up for much larger charges. At this time, a hunter of dangerous game would fire, gallop away on horseback to a safe distance, reload, and fire again, repeating this process up to 30 times for an African elephant.

The first 4 bores were probably single barrel muzzleloaders converted from British fowling pieces that were, in essence, slug guns. Loads (bullet weights and gunpowder loads) varied greatly. As the weight and strength increased, gunpowder loads went from 8 drams (0.5 oz, or 218.75 grains) of powder to a full ounce (16 drams, or 437.5 grains). The advent of rifling after about 1860 allowed longer conical projectiles to be stabilised, and, aside from accuracy, these provided even greater weight and penetration, with some hardened lead or steel bullets weighing as much as 2000 grains. The 4 bore was also occasionally used for shooting exploding projectiles. Although 4-bore firearms were commonly referred to as "rifles", smoothbore version of the weapon were actually more popular, and remained so throughout the era of 4-bore usage. Since dangerous game was shot at ranges under 40 yards, a smoothbore was sufficiently accurate, while at the same time providing higher velocities and lower recoil, and needing less cleaning. The prominent British gunmaker W. W. Greener even recommended against rifled firearms above the bore size of eight, with the four bores that he continued producing from then on being exclusively smoothbores. The smoothbore also, at least until the advent of breechloading, could be reloaded faster.

Many famous elephant hunters during the 19th century used such weapons, including George P. Sanderson in India and William Finaughty and Frederick Courteney Selous in Southern Africa. Sanderson, in particular, mentioned two four bore firearms that he used, one of which was rifled while the other was not. Although both weapons were of similar weights, the rifle was built to accommodate only one barrel with a powder charge only five-sixths that of the smoothbore, which was a double-barrel. Sanderson, in fact, discarded the rifle after a misfire of the weapon's cartridge almost led to his death, and the instance demonstrated the superiority of the smoothbore over the rifle in the case of an oversized firearm in his day in his mind. With the advent of breechloading cases in the late 19th century the 4 bore came into its current guise, that being the well-known 4–4.5" brass case.

(Note: 1 dram = 27.34375 grains in the avoirdupois system, since 256 drams = 7000 grains = 1 pound of powder. Shotgun shells are still rated in terms of the same archaic dram measurements, relative to their equivalence of smokeless powder load to a black-powder load weighed in drams.) A double barreled rifle that would fire such a calibre would weigh around 22–24 lb bare, while the single-barreled version would be around 17–18 lb. In common practice, the cartridge cases were not typically reloaded, as reliability was of the utmost importance, more important than a possible false cost savings from an attempt at reloading that might cost a hunter his life. Bullet lubrication was typically mostly beeswax based, such that in hot tropical climes there could be no possibility of a bullet lube melting from the base of the bullet, ruining the charge of powder within the cartridge. Reliability was the utmost concern.

Golden Age and later usage 
This caliber was used heavily by the European hunters, notably so the British and Dutch Boers, in tropical climates of Africa and India.  A single barreled smoothbore percussion cap musket of between four and six gauge called a "roah" was the standard weapon among Boer hunters, until the common acceptance of breechloading rifles among their ranks in the 1870s.  Many of the earliest British hunters adopted this practice from the Boers, with Selous being the best known among them.

Meant to be used with black powder due to its size, it was unpopular due to the problem of thick smoke and a powerful recoil. Notable hunters that used the rifles included Sir Samuel White Baker and Frederick Selous, who used it consistently in his career as an ivory hunter of African elephants between 1874 and 1876 until the advent of the lighter, more accurate and less cumbersome Nitro Express calibers and cordite propellant. In the mid-1870s, Selous favoured a four bore black powder muzzleloader for killing elephant, a  short barreled musket firing a quarter pound bullet with as much as 20 drams (540 grains) of black powder. He could wield it even from horseback. Between 1874 and 1876, he slew seventy-eight elephants with that gun, but eventually there was a double loading incident together with other recoil problems. He finally gave it up, due to it "upsetting my nerve".

Although a weapon of immense power, the four bore was far less effective than its Nitro Express successors because of the low penetration of its projectiles and its immense recoil. The huge lead slugs fired by the gun were sometimes capable of stunning a charging African elephant to stop it on its tracks, or turn its charge (causing it to change direction to avoid the hunter) but it was generally unable to kill the creature outright with a frontal brain shot. Chest and broadside shots were effective killers, as was the side shot on brain where the skull is thinner on elephant, however once again this did not help for instantly stopping an enraged elephant charging the hunter. On the other dangerous game species such as the Indian elephant, buffalo species and Rhino it was considered an excellent killer.

Henry Morton Stanley carried a 4 bore Farquhson single-shot rifle on his expedition to find David Livingstone.

Modern times 
The "4 bore rifle" caliber's technical data was reissued by C.I.P in 1993. The latest revision of the homologation papers were released by May 15, 2002. 
This standard and its variations are reflected in obsolete 4 gauge shotgun cartridges and their repurposing as modern 1-inch bore flare cartridges. 

Modern Russian KS-23 shotgun is roughly 4 gauge by these standards (though closer to 6 bore by American standards).

See also
 2 bore
 6 bore
 Double rifle
 Gauge (firearms)

Notes

Firearms by caliber
British firearm cartridges
Firearm terminology